Ahmadou Wagué is an African physicist who is a professor of physics at the Cheikh Anta Diop University. He has served as Vice President of the African Physical Society, President of the African Laser, Atomic Molecular, and Optical Sciences Network, member of the Senegalese National Academy of Science and Technology and founding member of the African Laser Centre.

Early life and education 
Wagué is from Senegal. He was a doctoral student at the Moscow State University and the Toulouse III - Paul Sabatier University, where he investigated two electron atomic systems.

Research and career 
Wagué has been involved in building interest and capacity in photonics sciences in Africa. In 1991 he became the founding Director of LAM, the African Laser, Atomic Molecular, and Optical Sciences Network. In 2002, Wagué was a founding member of the African Laser Centre. The centre was formed to provide African researchers with access to world-class laser facilities.

The International Centre for Theoretical Physics reviewed the effectiveness of campaigns to support physics in Africa, and questioned whether the African Physical Society was “the society Africa wanted and needed,”. After the report was released, Wagué called for the need to reform the African Physical Society. He was appointed their President, and oversaw a special Journal of the Optical Society of America focused on research in optics in Africa.

Wagué was elected to the International Council for the American Physical Society in 2017. He was elected a Fellow of the Society in 2022.

Personal life 
Wagué can speak several African languages, as well as English, French and Russian.

Selected publications

References 

Senegalese physicists
Academic staff of Cheikh Anta Diop University
Moscow State University alumni
Paul Sabatier University alumni
American Physical Society
Living people
Year of birth missing (living people)